"Forty Six & 2" is a song by the American progressive metal band Tool. It was released as the fourth single from their second major record release Ænima in 1996 and received radio airplay.

Title and theme
A popular belief is that the song title refers to an idea first conceived by Carl Jung. But this seems in error as no relevant citations to Jung on such an idea seem to be available. Such an idea is further attributed to Drunvalo Melchizedek concerning the possibility of reaching a state of evolution at which the body would have two more than the normal 46 total chromosomes and leave a disharmonious state. The premise is humans would deviate from the current state of human DNA which contains 44 autosomes and two sex chromosomes. The next step of evolution would likely result in human DNA being reorganized into 46 autosomes and two sex chromosomes, according to Melchizedek.

Additionally, it may refer to the desire to experience change through the "shadow", an idea that represents the parts of one's psyche, and identity that one hates, fears and represses; this exists as a recurring theme in the work of Carl Jung.

The song is mostly in 4/4 time with some sections of 7/8 in between. In the intro, Danny Carey plays four measures of 7/8 on his ride cymbal over the rest of the band playing in 4/4, and they all meet up on the downbeat of the 5th measure in 4/4. During the bridge there are three measures of 7/8 followed by one measure of 4/4. During a particular quad fill, the drums are in 3/8, the guitar plays one measure of 9/8 followed by one in 5/8 all while the bass keeps time in 7/8. Most of the song is written in D Phrygian dominant scale, also known as the fifth mode of the G harmonic minor scale.

Track listing

Chart performance

References

1996 songs
1997 singles
Tool (band) songs
Songs about science
1998 singles
Songs written by Maynard James Keenan
Songs written by Danny Carey
Songs written by Justin Chancellor
Songs written by Adam Jones (musician)